The 2009 Latvian Athletics Championships were held in Ventspils, Latvia on July 31 and August 1, 2009.

Men

Women

External links
Results

Sport in Ventspils
Latvian Athletics Championships
Latvian Athletics Championships, 2009
Latvian Athletics Championships